Irene Avaalaaqiaq Tiktaalaaq  (born 1941) is one of Canada's most renowned Inuit artists. Her work is rooted in her lived experience, often dealing with themes of being an orphan and Inuit stories her grandmother told her. Avaalaaqiaq Tiktaalaaq is noted for her drawings, prints, and wall hangings.

Personal background 
Avaalaaqiaq Tiktaalaaq was born on the north shore of Tebesjuak Lake near Baker Lake, Nunavut, Canada. Although she believes she was born in 1941, she was once told by an acquaintance that her actual year of birth was 1936. At that time in the area, the dates of births on the land were not generally recorded. Her mother, Gualittuaq, died shortly after Avaalaaqiaq was born, and her father, Itiplui, unable to care for her, so her grandparents raised her on the land in the customary Inuit style. Speaking of her childhood, Avaalaaqiaq Tiktaalaaq said:Whenever I see my wall hangings they remind me of my life. Also I always remember my grandmother and the stories and legends she told me. When I grew up there were no other people except my grandparents. I had never seen white people. When I do sewing and make a wall hanging I do what I remember. I can see it clear as a picture. When I am looking at it, it looks like it is actually happening in those days, as it was in my life. 

On August 9, 1956, she married David Tiktaalaaq in Baker Lake. They moved to Baker Lake in 1958, where Avaalaaqiaq Tiktaalaaq gave birth to one of their children.

Artwork 
Avaalaaqiaq Tiktaalaaq began her art career between 1969 and 1970 with small soapstone carvings, often of animals with human heads.

Her works are part of the collections at the National Gallery of Canada, the Winnipeg Art Gallery, the Baltimore Museum of Art, and the Macdonald Stewart Art Centre and the College of William and Mary in Virginia.

Exhibitions 
 Two Great Image Makers from Baker Lake, 1999 (with Josiah Nuilaalik)
 Works On Cloth, 2002

Institutions that have held exhibitions of her work, as cited in Judith Nasby's book Irene Avaalaaqiaq: myth and reality include: 
 Agnes Etherington Art Centre, Queens University, Kingston, Ontario 
 Amway Environmental Foundation Collection, Ada, Michigan
 Art Gallery of Ontario, Toronto, Ontario
 Baltimore Museum of Art, Baltimore, Maryland
 Canadian Guild of Crafts Quebec, Montreal, Quebec
 Canadian Museum of Civilization, Hull, Quebec
 Carleton University Art Gallery, Ottawa, Ontario
 CIBC Collection, Toronto, Ontario
 Confederation Centre Art Gallery and Museum, Charlottetown,
 Prince Edward Island
 Dennos Museum Center, Northwestern Michigan College, Traverse City,
 Michigan
 Heard Museum, Phoenix, Arizona
 Indian and Northern Affairs, Canada, Ottawa, Ontario
 Itsarnittakarvik: Inuit Heritage Centre, Baker Lake, Nunavut
 Kitchener-Waterloo Art Gallery, Kitchener, Ontario
 Macdonald Stewart Art Centre, Guelph, Ontario
 McMaster Museum of Art, McMaster University, Hamilton, Ontario
 McMichael Canadian Art Collection, Kleinburg, Ontario
 Mendel Art Gallery, Saskatoon, Saskatchewan
 Musee des beaux-arts de Montreal, Montreal, Quebec
 Museum of Anthropology, University of British Columbia, Vancouver,
 British Columbia
 National Gallery of Canada, Ottawa, Ontario
 Prince of Wales Northern Heritage Centre, Yellowknife, Northwest Territories
 University of Alberta, Edmonton, Alberta
 University of Delaware, Newark, Delaware
 University of Lethbridge Art Gallery, Lethbridge, Alberta
 University of New Brunswick, Fredericton, New Brunswick
 Winnipeg Art Gallery, Winnipeg, Manitoba

Honours 
In 1999, the University of Guelph awarded Avaalaaqiaq Tiktaalaaq an honorary doctorate of laws in recognition of her contribution to the development of Inuit art and her leadership role in the Nunavut community of Baker Lake. In her address, Avaalaaqiaq Tiktaalaaq remarked, "It makes me feel proud that my art is recognized after so many years of being an artist." Her address to the audience at the ceremony for the Ontario Agricultural College and the College of Arts was delivered in her native Inuktitut, with her friend Sally Qimmiu'naaq Webster acting as translator.

She was inducted into the Royal Canadian Academy of Arts.

References

External links
Marion Scott Gallery Newsletter (pdf file with photo)
Irene Avaalaaqiaq: Myth and Reality by Judith Nasby (book review)
Nuatsiaq News

1941 births
Living people
Inuit printmakers
Inuit illustrators
Members of the Royal Canadian Academy of Arts
People from Baker Lake
Canadian Inuit women
Artists from Nunavut
Canadian printmakers
20th-century Canadian women artists
21st-century Canadian women artists
Women printmakers
20th-century printmakers
Inuit from the Northwest Territories
Inuit from Nunavut